The 2002 FIA GT Pergusa 500 km was the eighth round the 2002 FIA GT Championship season.  It took place at the Autodromo di Pergusa, Italy, on 22 September 2002.

Official results
Class winners in bold.  Cars failing to complete 70% of winner's distance marked as Not Classified (NC).

Statistics
 Pole position – #4 Team Carsport Holland – 1:35.633
 Fastest lap – #4 Team Carsport Holland – 1:36.594
 Average speed – 166.390 km/h

References

 
 
 

P
FIA GT